Abdulrahman Khayrallah (born 23 February 1996) is a Saudi Arabian football player who plays as a winger for Al-Diriyah.

References

External links
 

Living people
1996 births
Association football forwards
Saudi Arabian footballers
Al-Shabab FC (Riyadh) players
Al-Taawoun FC players
Al-Washm Club players
Al-Jabalain FC players
Khaleej FC players
Al-Bukayriyah FC players
Al-Diriyah Club players
Sportspeople from Riyadh
Saudi Professional League players
Saudi First Division League players
Saudi Second Division players